The Season of the Inundation or Flood was the first season of the lunar and civil Egyptian calendars. It fell after the intercalary month of Days over the Year and before the Season of the Emergence. In the modern Coptic Calendar, this season lasts from Paoni 12 to Paopi 9.

Names
The pronunciation of the ancient Egyptian name for the Season of the Inundation is uncertain as the hieroglyphs do not record its vowels. It is conventionally transliterated Akhet. The name refers to the annual flooding of the Nile.

Lunar calendar
In the lunar calendar, the intercalary month was added as needed to maintain the heliacal rising of Sirius in the fourth month of the season of the Harvest. This meant that the Season of the Inundation usually lasted from September to January. Because the precise timing of the flood varied, the months of "Inundation" no longer precisely reflected the state of the river but the season was usually the time of the annual flooding. This event was vital to the people because the waters left behind fertile silt and moisture, which were the source of the land's fertility.

Civil calendar
In the civil calendar, the lack of leap years into the Ptolemaic and Roman periods meant the season lost about one day every four years and was not stable relative to the solar year or Gregorian calendar.

Months
The Season of the Inundation was divided into four months. In the lunar calendar, each began on a dawn when the waning crescent moon was no longer visible. In the civil calendar, each consisted of exactly 30 days divided into three 10-day weeks known as decans.

In ancient Egypt, these months were usually recorded by their number within the season: I, II, III, and IV Ꜣḫt. They were also known by the names of their principal festivals, which came to be increasingly used after the Persian occupation. These then became the basis for the names of the months of the Coptic calendar.

See also
 Egyptian & Coptic calendars
 Egyptian units of time
 Nilometer

Notes

References

Egyptian calendar